AC Connecticut women will be a women's amateur soccer team, set to begin play in 2022 in the new USL W League. They are an affiliate of Hartford Athletic, a men's team in the USL Championship.

History 
On June 8, 2021, it was announced that USL Championship team Hartford Athletic would operate an affiliate club and be one of the eight founding members of the new league.

On November 23, 2021, it was announced that the team would instead operate under the name AC Connecticut, the same name as the USL League Two team, AC Connecticut.  AC Connecticut will now serve as the affiliate to Hartford Athletic.

References 

Hartford Athletic
Women's soccer clubs in the United States
Soccer clubs in Connecticut
Sports teams in Hartford, Connecticut
2021 establishments in Connecticut
Association football clubs established in 2021
Women's sports in Connecticut
USL W League teams